The 2015 Tour de Suisse was the 79th edition of the Tour de Suisse stage race. It took place from 13 to 21 June and was the seventeenth race of the 2015 UCI World Tour. It started in Risch-Rotkreuz and finished in Bern. The race was composed of nine stages including two time trials, a short one on the first day and a long one on the last day. The event covered , and visited Liechtenstein and Austria on its fifth stage, which was the race's sole mountaintop finish.

The ultimate selection was made on the last day's individual time trial. Tom Dumoulin of the  squad rounded up the podium, having won the two individual time trial stages that bookended the race.

The mountains classification was initially awarded to Austria's Stefan Denifl, who featured in many breakaways to amass his points. Denifl was later disqualified following his suspension for doping in 2019. The sprints classification was won by Slovakian Peter Sagan who also was the victor of two stages. Team Sky finished at the head of the team classification with a margin of 11 minutes and 49 seconds.

Frenchman Thibaut Pinot grabbed the queen stage to the Rettenbach glacier and held the leader's jersey for four stages, but had to surrender it on the last day of competition to Špilak.

Teams
As a UCI World Tour event, the organisation was obliged to invite all seventeen UCI WorldTeams, and likewise, all seventeen teams were obligated to send a squad. To complete the field, two UCI Professional Continental teams were invited to join the race. The number of riders allowed per team was eight, so the starting field contained 152 cyclists.

Pre-race favourites

Rui Costa won the last three editions of the race, however he was not present at the 2015 event, as he raced in the Critérium du Dauphiné instead. More contenders for the overall classification of the Tour de France opted for the latter race since it was more mountainous. There were two former winners of the Tour de Suisse at the starting line,  teammates: Swiss Fabian Cancellara and Luxembourger Fränk Schleck.

Contenders for the general classification were Simon Špilak, Thibaut Pinot, Rafał Majka, Sergio Henao, Tom Dumoulin, Michał Kwiatkowski and Geraint Thomas. Other hopefuls were Jurgen Van den Broeck and Sébastien Reichenbach. It was 's Domenico Pozzovivo's first race after his disastrous crash in the Giro d'Italia, so his form was predicted as uncertain, but the Italian climber could certainly be a factor if he was in shape.

Peter Sagan (Tinkoff–Saxo) was a contender for stage wins. His directeur sportif (team manager) said he was the leader of the team and would target the opening prologue. Other riders contending stage glory were Alexander Kristoff and John Degenkolb. Cancellara, the 2009 winner, was recovering from a crash suffered at the E3 Harelbeke one-day race; his primary focus was on his recovery.

Route

An important race in its own right, the 2015 Tour de Suisse was used by some Tour de France riders to perfect their physical conditions, as the well-known French race started on 4 July. The route for the race was announced on 9 March 2015.

The race did not follow any particular pattern in terms of geographical displacement around the country, but did visit Liechtenstein and Austria on the fifth stage. It was also the longest of the race and was qualified as the queen stage. It finished near Sölden situated in Austrian territory and featured a mountaintop finish. After that, the race came back in Swiss territory for the remainder of the event. The stages which were likely to be the most important for the general classification were stage five and the individual time trial on the final stage.

On 4 June 2015, it was announced that the town of Brunnen was desisting itself from being the start of stage three because of road damage caused by a rocky landslide, and that the town of Quinto would instead be the starting town.

Stages

Stage 1

13 June 2015 — Risch-Rotkreuz to Risch-Rotkreuz, individual time trial (ITT)

The very short prologue contained three sharp corners. The first two kilometers were slightly uphill, the third one was slightly downhill and the rest was flat.

The best times coming from the first tier of riders were Matthias Brändle with 5' 45", Greg Van Avermaet a second slower and Cameron Meyer another second in arrears. Thibaut Pinot came in with a deficit of twelve seconds on Brändle. Michael Matthews also realised a good time, four seconds down on the provisional leader. Domenico Pozzovivo came to the finish with a fifteen-second deficit. Daniele Bennati had the best intermediate time all day, which was calculated with  remaining as the riders went through the checkpoint.

Fabian Cancellara, beat Brändle with a time of 5' 43". Time trialist Adriano Malori started soon after Cancellara crossed the finish line, but came in at 5' 47", four seconds slower.  rider Tom Dumoulin clocked 5' 41", 2 seconds better than Cancellara, and would ultimately be the winner of the stage.

's Silvan Dillier crashed as he was on a straight stretch of road. He managed to remount and finish the stage; his final position was last place, 1' 22" down. 's leader Geraint Thomas put in a fast ride, only seven seconds down on the winner. Peter Sagan came in five seconds in arrears of Dumoulin, missing out on his objective of being the first leader of the race. Poles Rafał Majka and Michał Kwiatkowski were 20 and 21 seconds down respectively.

After the event, Dumoulin said that he prepared at altitude for the race and that he produced a hard physical effort on the uphill section and went less intensely on the flatter parts.

Stage 2

14 June 2015 — Risch-Rotkreuz to Risch-Rotkreuz, 

The riders then rode a loop to tackle the latter climb once more about midway through the stage. The course came back down and effectuated another circuit to tackle the climb a second and last time. The riders negotiated the descent and ended up once again in Risch-Rotkreuz for the finale.

After  of racing, Luka Pibernik, Cameron Meyer, Jürgen Roelandts and Valerio Agnoli of  had an advantage of 1' 08" over chasers Ben King and Simone Antonini of Pro Continental team . They also enjoyed a lead of 2' 55" on the peloton. The two chasers soon fell back into the main field. The maximum gap the peloton allowed the escapees to have was 3' 20". As the main group attacked the climb of Michaelskreuz for the first time, Arnaud Démare crashed because of the fight for position.

With  to go, the riders attacked the climb of Michaelskreuz for the second and last time and caught the remnants of the breakaway on the way up. 's Jakob Fuglsang accelerated close to the summit, with only Geraint Thomas and Simon Špilak initially able to follow, while Michał Kwiatkowski lost contact. Thomas then attacked on the descent and was followed by Fuglsang and Špilak. Tom Dumoulin chased them as he wanted to protect his leader's jersey. A small group of nine riders formed on the descent.

Close to the final kilometre, Kristijan Đurasek of  placed an acceleration and continued to a solo victory on the flat run-in. The group came in four seconds in arrears, with Daniel Moreno winning the sprint for second place before Julián Arredondo (. Overall contenders Thibaut Pinot and Špilak were also part of that clique, coming in fourth and sixth respectively. Peter Sagan won the sprint of the following group, coming in tenth at fourteen seconds. Dumoulin kept his leader's jersey, while Pibernik amassed enough mountain points (18) to earn the mountains classification jersey.

Stage 3

15 June 2015 — Quinto to Olivone, 

This was the new version of the stage as the original route was closed due to a landslide. Then came a long false flat until a Category 2 climb, the  Zona Cumiasca. It was immediately followed by a Category 3 named ascent Via Cantonale, a  climb which summited  from the finish.

The race got on its way under cloudy but dry conditions. The Tour de Suisse was featuring the Gotthard Pass for the 34th time in its history, and a break formed along its early slopes, which featured cobbles. The two attackers were Stefan Denifl and Marco Marcato. The pair had a lead of 2' 30" on the main field as Branislau Samoilau was chasing them. Denifl got to the top of the climb first to rake in twenty points. By the top of the pass, snow was covering the sides of the road and the field was 3' 20" back. The riders put gilets on before the descent, which lasted almost . Samoilau succeeded in joining the escape during the downhill.

The competitors replenished their food stock at the feed zone situated shortly after the downhill section. The main field started accelerating, with the team of the leader Tom Dumoulin,  doing most of the work at the front. Realising this breakaway was gaining ground,  came to the fore to help, resulting in the gap going down gradually.

At the foot of the Zona Cumiasca climb, with  remaining, the gap had shrunk significantly. The peloton formed sprint trains to better position their leaders for the ascent. Marcato was soon dropped from the breakaway and Denifl won the mountain points. At that point, Denifl and Samoilau had only a thirty-second gap over the depleting field. Michael Albasini attacked, soon followed by Jan Bakelants. With the two escapees enjoying only a ten-second advantage, Sergio Henao accelerated and passed them. The trio was ultimately reeled in. Rafał Majka was working at the front of the small leading group to bring back the attackers to give his team leader Peter Sagan a chance at victory. In the last few kilometres, Sagan took over from Majka himself. He followed Daniel Moreno, who had chased down Esteban Chaves, passing him to take victory.

Stage 4

Then there were three Category 3 climbs on offer, which were the  Kirchberg climb repeated three times as the riders accomplished a loop. The finishing  were straight with a consistent incline.

Davide Malacarne and Thomas De Gendt attacked early in the stage. They were joined by a trio of Stijn Devolder, Alex Howes and Frederik Backaert. De Gendt crested the Wildhaus Pass first to take eight points in the mountains competition. At the summit, after  of racing, the gap between the peloton and the breakers was two minutes and fifty seconds.

De Gendt took maximum points atop the Kirchberg climb on the riders' first passage. The main field got through the same point 2' 05" in arrears. The breakaway was caught less than  later.  marshaled the field as De Gendt attacked again to no avail as he was swiftly swept back.

The last mountains points of the day atop the Kirchberg climb was won by Daryl Impey; it was uncontested and he won because he was riding at the front. With  to race he had opened up an advantage of 20 seconds. With  remaining, Lutsenko was caught. Matthews then passed him to claim his first victory at the Tour de Suisse. Sagan took second place and the points classification jersey.

Stage 5

17 June 2015 — Unterterzen to Sölden (Austria), 

This was the queen stage of the 2015 Tour de Suisse and was also the longest stage the race featured in the last twenty years. The competitors rode the Ötztal Glacier Road from Sölden to get to the finish line.

The overall race leader Tom Dumoulin said before the stage that if he lost less than one minute and a half to the pure climbers, he could still win the Tour by taking that time back on the final stage's time trial. The previous stage's victor Michael Matthews was a non-starter, saying he had gotten what he wanted from the race: a stage win. A breakaway formed in the opening  of the race. They were Grégory Rast, mountains jersey wearer Stefan Denifl and his teammate Matthias Brändle, Ben King, Przemysław Niemiec, Stefan Schumacher, Thomas De Gendt and Mirko Selvaggi. The best-placed cyclist in the break on the general classification was Selvaggi in 59th place, 18' 38" down on Dumoulin. Denifl amassed maximum points atop the Bielerhöhe Pass, comforting his lead in the mountains classification. Ion Izagirre of the  abandoned after the pass.

With  to go the gap was miscalculated by the race organisers as there were unrealistic fluctuations in the official timing throughout the long stretch of flat road before the final climb. With  to cover,  took control of the peloton for their leader Jakob Fuglsang.  and  started helping the chase at the front, since those teams had riders aiming for victory (Thibaut Pinot and the Daniel Moreno–Simon Špilak duo, respectively). With  to the start of the big final climb, the gap was around six and a half minutes. The break fractured, just as the peloton did later when they hit the Rettenbach ascent. Dumoulin was dropped almost at the beginning of it but resisted, climbing at his own pace. Špilak attacked with  remaining and dangled in front of a select group.

Behind, Domenico Pozzovivo placed an acceleration that put the lead group in difficulty, but he was brought back. The time gap rapidly decreased, due to dubious time monitoring again. Pinot launched an attack from the group, but Špilak had the resources to keep up with him for a while but was ultimately dropped. Pinot passed the passive Denifl before the arch signaling the last kilometre (flamme rouge) and took a solo victory. Pozzovivo finished second while Špilak settled for third. However, it became soon apparent that Dumoulin would not lose much more than the minute and a half that was his objective. He passed the line 1' 37" down on Pinot. "I'm very happy, it was important for me and the team. We came here to win a stage, and I had good legs today. I've got a lot of confidence now, that's important for the Tour de France. And it's true, racing in Switzerland seems to suit me", said Pinot. "The objective is to win overall here, but the rouleurs like [Geraint] Thomas and [Tom] Dumoulin aren't far back", he added. "It'll be a long and difficult time trial [on stage nine]. We'll see what happens on the day."

Stage 6

18 June 2015 — Wil to Biel/Bienne, 

This stage contained only one categorised ascent midway through it and was a Category 3 affair named Auensteinstrasse. Two intermediate sprints came before the run into town in the final .

As the stage started, there were 145 riders remaining in the race, as only seven entrants had abandoned since the start of the race. The day's breakers were Axel Domont, Marek Rutkiewicz, Matej Mohorič and Jérôme Baugnies. The riders soon tackled the Eschenmosen, one of the many uncategorised ascents of the day. With  left, the breakaway's advantage stood at 4' 30". The breakers took the points on offer on the only climb of the day, Auensteinstrasse, so Stefan Denifl of  maintained his 30-point advantage over his nearest competitor Thomas De Gendt. Rutkiewicz won the maximum five points that came with cresting the ascent first. About midway through, it was calculated that the peloton's average speed was slower than the slowest prediction by the organisers, most likely due to the severity of the previous stage.

At the  remaining arch, the break of four still held a lead of forty seconds with the two  riders placed between the groups.  took matters in their own hands and began forming their sprint train for Mark Cavendish.  moved to the front in support of their sprint hopeful, Peter Sagan. With  to cover, the escape had 30 seconds of an advantage. At that point, two  riders (Julien Vermote and Zdeněk Štybar) crashed on the water-logged tarmac before a bend, but the mishap had no consequences on the peloton. The breakers were brought back just before the flamme rouge.

Shortly thereafter, Cavendish lost the wheel of his lead-out man Mark Renshaw after struggling to come back after the crash which hindered his lead-out train. There were two technical turns before the finish line. It was Sagan's eleventh victory at the Tour de Suisse, matching the record of Hugo Koblet and Ferdinand Kübler.

Stage 7

19 June 2015 — Biel/Bienne to Düdingen, 

Stage 7 was a flat stage except for three Category 3 climbs in the second half of the stage. The opening  were totally flat. After , the riders tackled the finishing circuit twice. During that circuit, the first climb was the  Freiburgstrasse. There was a descent, then the Hauptstrasse climb was covered. During the second circuit, the Freiburgstrasse was attacked again. The final  were steep.

World road race champion Michał Kwiatkowski of the  squad made attempts at escaping before the peloton finally let him go  into the race. He was joined by Silvan Dillier, Daryl Impey and Axel Domont. The best placed rider in this quartet was Impey, 29' 18" down on race leader Thibaut Pinot. With  to go, the race passed through the village of Misery-Courtion, at which point the gap stood at 2' 50". A crash occurred in the outskirts of Misery-Courtion, involving Ben Hermans and Manuel Senni (both with ). They were able to remount their bikes and rejoined the main field.

With  remaining, the escapees had a minute's lead. Domont took the maximum points atop the first climb of the day. On the second lap of the finishing circuit, Domont was dropped from the breakaway and was absorbed in by the peloton. The now three-rider break had a thirty-second advantage with  remaining.  controlled the front of the field in the final kilometres. With  to go, the peloton almost pulled back the all unyielding breakers, as Kwiatkowski decided to go alone. He was caught in sight of the finish line. Sagan got out of Kristoff's slipstream to try to out-sprint him in the final metres, but to no avail. This was Kristoff's eighteenth victory of the season. Through bad positioning, Pinot lost a further five seconds to Geraint Thomas in the overall classification. "It was a hard day, I haven't felt super in this Tour de Suisse but I did a good sprint today", said the winner. "I got ahead of Sagan and I was able to go again at the end to hold off his run."

Stage 8

20 June 2015 — Bern to Bern, 

The stage was ridden in and around Bern, the first time the Tour de Suisse had been to the national capital since 2009. This was another stage which featured a lot of uncategorised rises. It however contained four Category 3 ascents. The event featured four circuits of  around town, on the same course that was to be used in the stage nine time trial. The two climbs present in the loops gave mountain points on the last two laps only. The riders first took on the  Category 3 Liebewill, then it was the  Aargauerstalden climb. The stage finished on the flat, a plateau after the latter ascent, featuring a number of technical turns.

A breakaway of twelve formed at the very start, but was deemed too dangerous and quickly reabsorbed. Citing back problems,  rider Jasper Stuyven abandoned the race. The attackers continued to try to form a break and a move by 's Michał Kwiatkowski finally made it. A break of nineteen riders emerged, containing among others Warren Barguil, the best placed rider of the move in the general classification at 4' 52". ,  and  led the chase.

With  to go in the stage, the gap stood at 2' 12". As the peloton passed through the finish line to undertake the last lap of the circuit, Jakob Fuglsang of  abandoned the race due to stomach problems. The peloton was forming a long single line as the pace was high. Maxime Monfort crashed and abandoned, with bruising on his shoulder and back.

With  remaining, 's Alexey Lutsenko attacked the escapees, followed by Jan Bakelants; they opened a gap, holding off their former breakaway companions. Bakelants led for the last few kilometres except under the flamme rouge and Lutsenko outsprinted him to claim the victory. He described the win as the biggest of his career.

Stage 9

21 June 2015 — Bern to Bern, individual time trial (ITT)

The lengthy individual time trial featured a climb in the middle of it, but no mountains classification points were on offer. The course was technical and featured several turns. It was the same course that was raced four times in stage eight, except that the finish line was not situated at the same place. Midway through the stage, the riders took on the difficulty of the day, the  Liebewill climb. There were other small climbs situated on the course.

The final general classification of the race was decided on this stage, and a majority of the observers believed that Pinot would lose his lead since he is not a great time trialist. Tom Dumoulin won the short prologue and was a contender for overall victory as a time trial specialist, but he had 1' 24" to make up. Fourth-placed Domenico Pozzovivo was an enigma, as he had mixed performances in time trials throughout his career. As far as the stage win was concerned, solo effort specialists Fabian Cancellara and Adriano Malori were to be considered, but they had no chance of a victory in the general classification since they were too far down in the rankings.

The riders started in reverse order of the general classification, so Pinot was the last one to start. The riders went off the starting ramp in two-minute intervals. Cancellara got on course early, as he was the seventh man to start. He clocked a time of 48' 55", which would stay a reference for most of the day. He was followed out of the starting area by Matthias Brändle who came in 2' 28" after Cancellara, somewhat surprisingly as he is a time trial specialist. Malori set the best time at the  intermediate point but faded a little bit in the end, coming to the finish line only 15 seconds off Cancellara's time. Cancellara would stay as a reference for a while now that some time trial specialists had finished their effort and failed to beat him. Damien Gaudin clocked in a time of 50' 46" which put him in sixth position.

Cameron Meyer put in a time of 49' 43", 48 seconds off Cancellara's mark. Around that time, general classification hopeful Dumoulin started his time trial. Silvan Dillier provisionally slotted into sixth position with a time of 50' 19" and minutes later, race leader Pinot rolled down the starting ramp. Jérôme Coppel crossed the finish line with a rapid time, only 25 seconds off Cancellara's performance. Meanwhile, in early time splits, Pinot had already lost twelve seconds to Thomas. The previous day's stage winner Alexey Lutsenko of  confirmed his good form with a time of 50' 32". At the  marker, Dumoulin beat Malori's best time by eleven seconds. Špilak was also doing a fast time trial, being equal to the best time at the  mark and passing the  arch faster than Dumoulin by four tenths of a second. By that time, Pinot had virtually lost his lead. Dumoulin took a very focused corner and he almost slammed into spectators upon exiting it, but no accident occurred. Špilak needed fourteen seconds over Thomas to get in front of him in the general classification. Therefore, Špilak won the race overall by five seconds.

"I’m really happy and want to thank my teammates who helped me too much during the race. This is the biggest win of my career so far", Spilak said. "The time trial was really hard but I liked it. It was up and down all the way and that helped me. I gave it everything." It was the Slovenian's tenth victory in the professional ranks.

Classification leadership
In the 2015 Tour de Suisse, three different jerseys were awarded. For the general classification, calculated by adding each cyclist's finishing times on each stage, and the leader received a yellow jersey. This classification was considered the most important of the Tour de Suisse, and the winner of the classification was considered the winner of the race. There was also a mountains classification, the leadership of which was marked by a light blue jersey. In the mountains classification, points were won by reaching the top of a climb before other cyclists, with more points available for the higher-categorised climbs. Hors Category gave 20 points to the first rider crossing (20, 15, 10, 6, 4), a Category 1 was worth 12 points (12, 8, 6, 4, 2), a Category 2 was worth 8 points (8, 6, 4, 2, 1) and a Category 3 was worth 5 points (5, 3, 2, 1).

The third jersey represented the points classification, marked by a white-and-red jersey. In the points classification, cyclists got points for finishing highly in a stage. A stage victory awarded 10 points, with 8 points for second, 6 for third, 4 for fourth and 2 for fifth. Points could also be earned at intermediate sprints location for finishing in the top three during each stage on a 6–3–1 scale. There was also a classification for teams, in which the times of the best three cyclists per team on each stage were added together; the leading team at the end of the race was the team with the lowest total time.

A combativity award was also attributed for the rider who had ridden the most aggressively in the eyes of the judges at the end of every stage. It could have been a rider who featured in breakaways or a cyclist who attacked often.

Classification standings

General classification

Points classification

Mountains classification

Teams classification

Notes

References

Sources

External links

Tour de Suisse
Tour de Suisse
Tour de Suisse